Daniel F. Doyle (born February 6, 1940) is an American former professional basketball player. He played for the NBA's Detroit Pistons in four games early into the 1962–63 season and recorded 16 total points.

References

1940 births
Living people
American men's basketball players
Basketball players from New York City
Belmont Abbey Crusaders men's basketball players
Detroit Pistons draft picks
Detroit Pistons players
Pittsburgh Rens players
Power forwards (basketball)
Sportspeople from Queens, New York
Trenton Colonials players